The Florida State Seminoles football team represents Florida State University (variously Florida State or FSU) in the sport of American football. The Seminoles compete in the NCAA Division I Football Bowl Subdivision (FBS) of the National Collegiate Athletic Association (NCAA) and the Atlantic Coast Conference (ACC). The Seminoles previously competed as part of the ACC Atlantic Division. The team is known for its storied history, distinctive helmet, fight song, colors, and many other traditions associated with the school.

Florida State has won three national championships, eighteen conference titles and six division titles along with a playoff appearance. The Seminoles have achieved three undefeated seasons, finished ranked in the top four of the AP Poll for 14 straight years from 1987 through 2000 and completed 41 straight winning seasons from 1977 through 2017; from 2012 through 2014, the team won 29 consecutive games, tied for the twelfth-longest winning streak in college football and tied for the longest winning streak in ACC history; from 1992 through 1995, the team also won 29 consecutive conference games, the longest winning streak in ACC history. The 1999 team received votes from ESPN as one of the top teams in college football history.

The team has produced three Heisman Trophy winners: quarterbacks Charlie Ward in 1993, Chris Weinke in 2000 and Jameis Winston in 2013. The Biletnikoff Award, presented annually to the top receiver in college football, is named for Florida State hall of famer Fred Biletnikoff. Other awards won by Florida State players include the Walter Camp Award, the Maxwell Award, the Davey O'Brien Award, the Lombardi Award, the Dick Butkus Award, the Johnny Unitas Golden Arm Award, the Lou Groza Award, the Dave Rimington Trophy and the Bobby Bowden Award. Florida State coaches have been honored with the Bobby Dodd Coach of the Year Award, the Walter Camp Coach of the Year Award, the Home Depot Coach of the Year Award, the Broyles Award, and the Paul "Bear" Bryant Award. Many former Seminoles have gone on to have successful careers in the NFL.

The program has produced 219 All-Americans (45 consensus and 15 unanimous) and 250 professional players. Florida State has had six members inducted into the College Football Hall of Fame, three members inducted into the College Football Coaches Hall of Fame and five members inducted into the Pro Football Hall of Fame.

The Seminoles have the tenth-highest winning percentage among all college football programs in Division I FBS history with over 500 victories and twenty-five ten win seasons. Florida State has appeared in 50 postseason bowl games and rank ninth nationally for bowl winning percentage and fourth for bowl wins. The Seminoles' archrivals are Florida, whom they meet annually in the last game of the regular season, and Miami; both games are considered among the greatest rivalries in college football. A rivalry with Clemson has developed and grown due to both teams competing yearly for the Atlantic division.

The team is coached by Mike Norvell, and plays home games at Bobby Bowden Field at Doak Campbell Stadium, the 18th largest stadium in college football and the 2nd largest in the ACC, located on-campus in Tallahassee, Florida.

History

Early history (1902–1975)

As early as the 1890s, Florida State had a football team. Florida State University traces the start of its athletic program to 1902, when Florida State College played the first of its three seasons. From 1902 to 1904, the institution then known as Florida State College fielded a varsity football team called "The Eleven" that played other teams. The Florida State players wore gold uniforms with a large purple F on the front. Their pants were lightly padded, but their upper bodies were largely unprotected. Leather helmets with ear guards covered their heads, and shoehorn-shaped metal nose guards were strapped across their faces. 

W. W. Hughes, professor of Latin and the head of men's sports at the school, served as the first coach. They played their first game against the Bainbridge Giants, a city team from Bainbridge, Georgia, defeating them 5–0. The team then played back-to-back matches against Florida Agricultural College (which later merged into what is now the University of Florida) one week apart, winning the first 6–0 and losing the second 0–6. The following season student enthusiasm grew even more, and the Eleven arranged a full schedule of six games. They competed against teams such as the University of Florida in Lake City (as Florida Agricultural College was then called), Georgia Tech, and the East Florida Seminary (another school that merged into the University of Florida), and finished the season by competing against Stetson College in Jacksonville for The Florida Times-Union Championship Cup. The following year Jack Forsythe, later the first head coach of the Florida Gators, replaced Hughes as coach, and the Eleven won the unofficial "state championship" by defeating Stetson in Tallahassee. Jock Hanvey assisted Forsythe. 

This would be The Eleven's last season, however, as the Florida State Legislature passed the Buckman Act, which reorganized Florida's six colleges into three institutions segregated by gender and race: a school for white males, a school for white females, and a school for African Americans. Florida State College became Florida Female College until 1909, when it became Florida State College for Women. Four other institutions (including the University of Florida in Lake City and the East Florida Seminary) were merged into the new white men's-only University of the State of Florida in Gainesville. Males who formerly attended Florida State College were required to transfer to the Gainesville campus, although several former FSC players transferred to Grant University (now the University of Tennessee at Chattanooga), with five joining Grant's football team. In 1909 several veterans of the FSC Eleven founded a city team named the Tallahassee Athletics, but this folded after one season. Except for this, until 1947, Tallahassee's only organized or collegiate football team were the team from the Florida Agricultural and Mechanical College for Negroes (now Florida A&M University)./

The end of World War II brought enormous pressure on the university system in Florida, which saw an influx of veterans applying for college under the GI Bill. The Florida Legislature responded by renaming the Florida State College for Women to Florida State University and allowing men to attend the university for the first time since 1905; football then returned to the university, beginning with the 1947 season. From 1948 through 1959, the Seminole football program achieved much success under coaches Don Veller and Tom Nugent. Ed Williamson, who introduced football to the school, served as the first coach of the Florida State Seminoles. In his first and only season with Florida State, the Seminoles posted an 0–5 record. Williamson has the worst record out of all the head coaches at Florida State and the only coach to have a winless mark. As the second coach at Florida State, Don Veller coached at Florida State for five years and compiled a record of 31–12–1. Veller was the first coach to find success coaching the Seminoles. In 1950, Veller led the Seminoles to an 8–0 record, the first unbeaten season in school history. Once Veller left the school, Tom Nugent became the third coach at Florida State. He stayed at Florida State for six years and compiled a record of 34–28–1. In one of his most notable accomplishments, Nugent gave the Seminoles their first win over an SEC opponent with a 10–0 victory against Tennessee in 1958. The fourth coach at Florida State was Perry Moss who coached the Seminoles for one year after compiling a 4–6 record. He became the second Florida State coach to leave the school with a losing record and the second to coach at the school for only one season after leaving to coach in the CFL.

With the arrival of head coach Bill Peterson in 1960, the Seminoles began their move to national prominence. Under Peterson's direction, the Seminoles beat the Florida Gators for the first time in 1964 and earned their first major bowl bid. Peterson also led the Seminoles to their first ever top ten ranking. During his tenure as head coach, Peterson also gave a young assistant by the name of Bobby Bowden his first major college coaching opportunity. Although not widely known, the Seminoles achieved their first ever number one ranking during this period. In October 1964, the Dunkel College Football Index, a popular power index of that era, placed the Seminoles at the top of their poll after a stunning 48–6 win over highly ranked Kentucky (AP No. 5, Dunkel No. 3). Peterson would be named UPI national coach of the week after this program changing victory. In an era of very few bowl games, Peterson's innovative offensive system helped earn the Seminoles four bowl bids from 1964 through 1968. During this time, only Alabama and Mississippi appeared in more bowl games than did Peterson's Seminoles. Receiving a football scholarship, famed actor Robert Urich was a back up center on the Seminoles from 1964 to 1967. In 1968, Peterson's eighth year at the helm, the Seminoles claimed their third straight bowl bid as Florida State became the first major college in the state of Florida to earn such a distinction. The Seminoles would not repeat this feat again until the ninth season of the Bobby Bowden era. In the summer of 1967, Peterson also engineered another first for the Seminole program when he decided to begin the recruitment of African American football players. Apparently, he did so without approval from either the school president or its athletic director. On December 16, 1967, the Seminoles signed Ernest Cook, a fullback from Daytona Beach. Several months later, the Seminoles would sign running back Calvin Patterson from Dade County. Ultimately, Cook decided to switch his allegiance to Minnesota where he would become an All-Big Ten running back. In the fall of 1968, Patterson would become the first African American student to play for the Seminoles as a starter for the Florida State freshmen football team. In the fall of 1970, J. T. Thomas would become the first African American to play in a varsity game for the Seminoles.

Following Peterson's successful run, the next two coaches had disappointing tenures. Larry Jones was appointed as the sixth head coach at Florida State. Jones coached for three years from 1971–1973 and compiled a record of 15–19, becoming the third Florida State coach to have a losing record. Darrell Mudra was then hired to be the seventh coach of the Seminoles. Mudra lasted just two years from 1974–1975 and compiled a record of 4–18. He became the fourth head coach to have a losing record at Florida State.

Bobby Bowden era (1976–2009)

Under head coach Bobby Bowden, who came to Florida State from West Virginia, the Seminoles became one of the nation's most competitive programs, greatly expanding the tradition of football at Florida State. The Seminoles played in five national championship games between 1993 and 2000, and claimed the championship twice, in 1993 and 1999. The FSU football team was the most successful team in college football during the 1990s, boasting an 89% winning percentage. FSU also set an NCAA record for most consecutive Top 5 finishes in the AP football poll – receiving placement 14 years in a row, from 1987 to 2000. The Seminoles under Bowden were the first college football team in history to go wire-to-wire (ranked first place from preseason to postseason) since the AP began releasing preseason rankings in 1936. 

In the Bowden era, prior to a 1989 game against long-standing rival Miami, University of Miami mascot Sebastian the Ibis was tackled by a group of police officers at Doak Campbell Stadium in Tallahassee as the mascot attempted to put out Chief Osceola's flaming spear. Sebastian was wearing a fireman’s helmet and yellow raincoat and holding a fire extinguisher. When a police officer attempted to grab the fire extinguisher, the officer was sprayed in the chest. Sebastian was handcuffed by four officers but ultimately released. University of Miami quarterback Gino Torretta told ESPN, "Even if we weren't bad boys, it added to the mystique that, 'Man, look, even their mascot's getting arrested.'" In the late 1980s and throughout the 1990s, the Seminoles had 14 consecutive seasons with 10 or more wins and a top four finish, with a record of 152–19–1 between these years (11 of their 19 losses were decided by seven points or less), and one of the best home records of the era. FSU's accomplishments in these 14 seasons included eleven bowl wins, nine ACC championships, two Heisman Trophy winners, and two national championships.

On December 1, 2009 Bowden announced that he would retire from coaching after the Seminoles' game on New Year's Day 2010 against West Virginia, Bowden's former team, in the Gator Bowl. His legacy has led to the creation of two awards in his honor, the Bobby Bowden Award, an award presented to college football players, and the Bobby Bowden National Collegiate Coach of the Year Award, an award presented to college football coaches. In the spring of 2007, several FSU athletes including football players were accused of cheating in an online music history class. The NCAA ruled that Florida State was guilty of major violations, announced that it would reduce scholarship limits in 10 sports and force Florida State to vacate all of the victories in 2006 and 2007 in which the implicated athletes participated and placed the university on probation for four years. FSU vacated 12 football victories from the 2006 and 2007 seasons and Bowden finished his career with 377 career wins.

Post-Bowden years (2010–present)

On January 5, 2010, Jimbo Fisher officially became the ninth head football coach in Florida State history. Fisher had been a member of the Florida State staff for three years, serving as offensive coordinator. He was named head coach-in waiting during the 2008 season. In his first season as head coach, Florida State went 10–4 with a 6–2 record in ACC conference play. The Seminoles went to their first ACC Championship Game since 2005, losing to Virginia Tech 44–33, and had their first ten win season since 2003. Fisher's first Florida State team notably beat both of its in-state rivals, the Miami Hurricanes and the Florida Gators, for the first time since 1999. Florida State would go on to the Chick-fil-A Bowl, where they would beat Steve Spurrier's South Carolina team. In his second season, Florida State went 9–4 with a 5–3 record in ACC conference play. For the second year in a row, the Seminoles defeated both of their in-state rivals. Fisher's second Florida State team also defeated Notre Dame in the Champs Sports Bowl. In his third season, he led the Seminoles to their first conference title in seven years and defeated Northern Illinois to win the Orange Bowl. In the 2013 season, Jimbo Fisher guided his team to a perfect 14–0 record and a national championship with a comeback win against Auburn. In 2014, he guided Florida State to another undefeated regular season, only to be throttled by Oregon 59–20 in the Rose Bowl–the most points the Seminoles had ever surrendered in a bowl game. Florida State had victories over both in-state rivals, Florida and Miami, in six of Jimbo Fisher's first seven seasons as head coach and won ten or more games in six of his eight seasons. While the Seminoles would win at least 10 games in the next two seasons and even finished eighth in the final 2016 poll, they lost five games in ACC play–one fewer than they had lost in Fisher's first five seasons. One of those losses was a 63–20 rout at the hands of Louisville, the most points Florida State had ever surrendered at the time. In 2017, the Seminoles were ranked third in preseason polls, but a 24–7 drubbing by Alabama and a close loss to NC State knocked them out of the polls altogether for the first time since the middle of the 2011 season, and ultimately finished with their first losing on-field record in ACC play since joining the league.

Fisher resigned as FSU head coach on December 1, 2017, to accept a record ten-year, $75 million contract to become head coach at Texas A&M. Defensive line coach and former defensive lineman Odell Haggins was named interim head coach, becoming Florida State's first African-American head coach, and coached in his first game the next day against Louisiana-Monroe. The Seminoles won, extending their bowl streak to an NCAA record 36 seasons. He went on to coach the Seminoles in the bowl game, leading them to a win and their 41st consecutive winning season.

On December 5, 2017, Willie Taggart left Oregon to become the new head coach at Florida State. In his first season, the Seminoles finished with a losing record for the first time since 1976 and missed a bowl game for the first time in 36 years. On November 3, 2019, Taggart was fired following a loss to Miami and a 4–5 record throughout the first nine games of the season. Haggins was once again named interim head coach to finish out the season.

On December 8, 2019, Memphis head coach Mike Norvell was named the new head coach at Florida State. On September 11, 2021, the Seminoles lost to Jacksonville State; it was the first time Florida State had lost to a non-FBS opponent since 1959. In 2022, Mike Norvell led the Seminoles to a 9-3 regular season record and a berth in the 2022 Cheez-It Bowl to play against Oklahoma. Florida State moved up in the AP Poll during the season for the first time since 2016, peaking at #13 prior to the bowl game and winning the most regular season games for the first time since that season as well. The Seminoles would go on to defeat the Sooners to finish with ten wins for the first time in six years.

Conference affiliations
In the first year of the program, Florida State competed as an independent program without conference affiliation. They were members of the Dixie Conference for three years before returning to independence. They would remain this way until 1992 when, after being courted by several conferences including the Southeastern Conference, they opted to join the Atlantic Coast Conference which is the same conference that they compete in today.

Southern Intercollegiate Athletic Association (1902–1904)
Independent (1947)
Dixie Conference (1948–1950)
Independent (1951–1991)
Atlantic Coast Conference (1992–present)
Atlantic Division (2005–2022)

Championships

National championships
Florida State has been selected national champions in eight seasons by NCAA-designated major selectors. Florida State claims the 1993, 1999 and 2013 national championships after winning a postseason bowl national championship game and being named the national champion by all four major consensus selectors  (AP, Coaches, FWAA, and NFF).

Claimed national championships

Unclaimed national championships

1993 season

The Seminoles entered 1993 with a number one ranking and were led by quarterback and eventual Heisman Trophy winner Charlie Ward.

Florida State cruised to a 9–0 record with their closest game being an 18-point win over Miami. The only loss of the season came at second-ranked and undefeated Notre Dame by a score of 31–24, in one of the greatest games in college football history. Despite the loss, Florida State still went on to play for the national title, beating Nebraska in the Orange Bowl with a field goal in the final seconds to claim the school's first national title.

1999 season

After falling short in the national title game against Tennessee in 1998, the Seminoles began the 1999 season ranked first in the country.

Florida State would go on to complete just the second undefeated season in school history and became the first team in history to be ranked number one for an entire season. The Noles would clinch their second national title with a victory over Virginia Tech in the Sugar Bowl.

2013 season

After the 2012 season, FSU lost six coaches including defensive coordinator Mark Stoops. Despite the numerous coaching changes and off the field incidents, Florida State would go on to become the highest scoring team in FBS history by scoring 723 points in a single season en route to their third national championship. The record has since been broken by the 2019 LSU Tigers, with a new lead of 726 points. The 2013 Seminoles would hand then third ranked Clemson their worst home loss, set a new attendance record at Doak Campbell Stadium of 84,409 against the seventh ranked Miami Hurricanes, and set a school scoring record of 80 points in a game against the University of Idaho behind freshman quarterback and eventual Heisman Trophy winner Jameis Winston.

Conference championships

† Co-champions

Division championships

† Co-champions

Bowl games

This is a partial list of the ten most recent bowl games Florida State has competed in.

	

Florida State has played in 50 bowl games in its history and has a 29–17–3 record in those games. The Seminoles are the ninth most successful bowl team in history and played in a record 36 consecutive bowl games from 1982–2017, although the NCAA doesn't recognize this because their 2006 Emerald Bowl win and appearance were both vacated as a result of the 2007 academic scandal.

Head coaches

Florida State has had 14 head coaches since organized football began in 1902. Bobby Bowden, who spent 34 years at Florida State, is the winningest coach in school history and has been inducted into the College Football Hall of Fame. During his tenure, Bobby Bowden won two national championships with the Seminoles, while Jimbo Fisher won one. Fisher and Bowden also have the second and third best ACC winning percentages in conference history.

† Interim head coach

‡ Bobby Bowden's record omits 12 vacated victories including 1 bowl victory, that would otherwise make his record 316–97–4.

Doak S. Campbell Stadium

The Florida State Seminoles originally played their home games at Centennial Field until 1950. The Seminoles had an 8–4 record at Centennial, including two undefeated home records. The team play their home games at Doak Cambell Stadium, which has a capacity of 79,560. Florida State is 314–105–4 in 423 games played at Doak Campbell.

The stadium, named after former school president Doak Sheridan Campbell, hosted its first game against the Randolph-Macon College Yellowjackets on October 7, 1950 with the Seminoles winning the game 40–7. At that time the facility had a seating capacity of 15,000. Doak Campbell Stadium, with its original capacity of 15,000 in 1950, was built at a cost of $250,000. In 1954, the stadium grew to a capacity of 19,000. Six thousand more seats were added in 1961. During the Bill Peterson era (1960–70), the stadium was expanded to 40,500 seats, and it remained at that capacity for the next 14 years. Since that time, the stadium has expanded to almost 83,000, largely due to the success of the football team under head coach Bobby Bowden coupled with the ever-growing student body. It now is the second largest football stadium in the Atlantic Coast Conference (ACC).

Aesthetically, a brick facade surrounding the stadium matches the architectural design of most of the buildings on the university's campus. In addition to the obvious recreational uses, The University Center surrounds the stadium and houses many of the university's offices as well as The College of Motion Picture Arts, The Dedman School of Hospitality, and The College of Social Work. The field was officially named Bobby Bowden field on November 20, 2004 as Florida State hosted intrastate rival Florida. Florida State has been recognized as having one of the best gameday atmospheres in the country, and Doak Campbell Stadium has been named one of the top stadiums in college sports.

Doak Campbell Stadium has been a great home field advantage for the Noles. Florida State is one of only three schools that can boast a decade home field unbeaten streak. The Seminoles never lost a home game from 1992–2001, a total of 54 games, and have completed 23 undefeated seasons at their home stadiums, including 21 at Doak Campbell.

The record crowd for the stadium is 84,431; set during a game against the Notre Dame Fighting Irish on October 18, 2014.

Rivalries

Florida

The Florida Gators are the main rival of the Florida State Seminoles. Florida State and Florida have played each other 67 times, with the Gators holding a 37–27–2 advantage. After the arrival of Bobby Bowden in 1976, the Seminoles have compiled a record of 25–22–1. The game alternates between Florida's home stadium, Ben Hill Griffin Stadium at Florida Field in Gainesville, Florida and Florida State's home stadium, Bobby Bowden Field at Doak Campbell Stadium in Tallahassee, Florida.

Miami

The rivalry dates to 1951, when the Miami Hurricanes defeated the Seminoles 35–13 in their inaugural meeting. The schools have played uninterrupted since 1966, with Miami leading the series 35–32, as of the 2022 season. 

During the 1980s and 90s, the series emerged as one of the premier rivalries in college football. Between 1983 and 2013, the Hurricanes and Seminoles combined to win 8 national championships (5 for Miami, 3 for Florida State) and played in 15 national championship games (1983, 85, 86, 87, 89, 91, 92, 93, 96, 98, 99, 2000, 01, 02, 13). The rivalry has been popular not only because of its profound national championship implications and the competitiveness of the games but also because of the immense NFL-caliber talent typically present on the field when the two teams meet. The famous 1987 matchup featured over 50 future NFL players on both rosters combined.

The rivalry is a television ratings bonanza, accounting for the two highest rated college football telecasts in ESPN history. The 2006 game between Miami and FSU was the second most-viewed college football game, regular season or bowl, in the history of ESPN, averaging 6.33 million households in viewership (a 6.9 rating). It trailed only the 1994 game between Miami and FSU, which notched a 7.7 rating.

Florida Cup

The Florida Cup is the trophy sponsored by the state of Florida given to either the Florida State University Seminoles, the University of Florida Gators, or the University of Miami Hurricanes for winning a round-robin against the other two teams in the same season (including bowl games if necessary).

It was created in 2002 by the Florida Sports Foundation, the official sports promotion and development organization of the state of Florida, and the Florida Championships Awards, Inc. The idea of finally having a trophy for the round robin winner between the three schools was enthusiastically endorsed by then governor Jeb Bush. Along with the Commander-in-Chief's Trophy (given to the winner of the round robin between Army, Navy and Air Force), the Florida Cup is one of the very few three way rivalries that presents a trophy to the winner.

The Florida Cup was awarded to the Florida State Seminoles in 2013, as Florida and Miami played in the regular season. The Makala Trophy is awarded to the winner of the Florida–Florida State game at the winning team's spring scrimmage.

Clemson

Florida State has a rivalry with Atlantic Division foe Clemson Tigers. Florida State leads the all-time series 20–15. The Seminoles dominated the contests through most of the 1990s but 1999 marked a milestone as the hire of Bobby Bowden's son Tommy led to the first meeting, in 1999, which was the first time in Division I-A history that a father and a son met as opposing head coaches in a football game. During the time Tommy coached at Clemson, the game was known as the "Bowden Bowl"; Bobby won the series in the 9 years it was played before Tommy's resignation, taking 5 of those games with all four losses within the last five seasons.

One sticking point in the rivalry remains that a proud Clemson Tiger program that was strong in the 1980s had won 6 of the past 11 ACC titles from 1981–91. 1991 would be the last ACC Championship the Tigers would win until 2011 as Florida State entered the ACC in 1992 and proceeded to win the next 9 ACC Championships in a row, and 12 of the next 14 in the series.

Virginia

The Seminoles also have a rivalry with the Virginia Cavaliers. Florida State and Virginia compete for the Jefferson–Eppes Trophy. The two schools have played for the trophy since its creation in 1995. It has been awarded a total of 19 times, with FSU receiving it 14 times (FSU vacated its 2006 win). The Seminoles hold the all-time advantage 14–4. Because of conference expansion, the teams no longer play annually; the teams last met in 2019.

The Jefferson–Eppes Trophy is awarded to the winner of the Florida State–Virginia game. This game was played annually from 1992 through 2005, but since the conference split into divisions, the teams meet twice every six years. Florida State has been awarded the trophy 15 times.

Notable games
1950 – First Game at Doak – Florida State played the first game at Doak Campbell Stadium, a 40–7 win over Randolph-Macon College.
1964 – FSU's First Win Over UF – Florida State had never beaten Florida, gaining only a 3–3 tie in six tries, all at Gainesville. Since 1947, when Florida State College for Women became Florida State University, its athletes have endured "girl school" taunts. During the week Florida players wore stickers on their helmets in practice reading "Never, FSU, Never." The thrust may have added considerable fuel to FSU's already blazing fire. FSU's aggressive defense helped force five Florida fumbles, and the Seminoles claimed four of them. The Tribe intercepted two passes. FSU lost two fumbles and had one pass intercepted. Steve Tensi connected on 11 of 22 throws for 190 yards. Fred Biletnikoff, a decoy much of the way and well covered by Florida, caught only two, for 78 yards and a touchdown. The 16–7 win ended six years of FSU frustration against the Gators and left Florida with a 5–3 record. FSU ended its regular season with an 8–1–1 chart, a showing exceeded only by an unbeaten 1950 season.
1988 – Puntrooskie – Florida State had a 4th down and 4 to go at its own 21-yard line with about a minute and a half to go in the 4th quarter at Clemson. They lined up to punt but the ball was snapped to an up back who handed it to Leroy Butler who ran down the left side of the field all the way to the Clemson 4-yard line. Florida State wound up kicking a field goal to win the game, 24–21.
1991 – Big Win at the Big House – In their first trip ever to Michigan Stadium, Florida State would beat the No. 3 Michigan Wolverines 51–31 behind quarterback Casey Weldon's 268 yards and 2 touchdowns and Amp Lee's 122 yards rushing. One of the most memorable plays in Florida State history occurred on Michigan's 1st play in the 1st quarter when cornerback Terrell Buckley returned an Elvis Grbac interception for a 40-yard touchdown.
1993 – Ward to Dunn – The Seminoles came into The Swamp ranked No. 1 and looking to play for the national championship. Florida had clinched the SEC East championship and were themselves ranked in the top five. Early on it looked to be a Florida State rout, as the Seminoles took a 27–7 lead into the fourth quarter. However, Florida scored two quick touchdowns to make the score 27–21. With six minutes remaining, the Seminoles faced third down at their own 21-yard-line. In what many people consider the greatest play in Florida State history, Heisman Trophy winning quarterback Charlie Ward hit freshman Warrick Dunn up the sideline for a 79-yard game-clinching touchdown run and a 33–21 FSU win.
1994 – FSU Wins First National Championship – This 60th edition of the Orange Bowl featured the Nebraska Cornhuskers and the Florida State Seminoles. Florida State came into the game 11–1, and ranked first in the nation. Nebraska came into the game undefeated at 11–0, and with a number 2 ranking. Late in 4th quarter, FSU's Heisman trophy winning quarterback Charlie Ward drove the Seminoles all the way to the Nebraska 3-yard line. The Huskers held and forced Scott Bentley to kick his fourth field goal of the night, which was good, and FSU led 18–16 with just 21 seconds remaining. Florida State players and coaches went wild on the sidelines, and were penalized for excessive celebration, costing them 15 yards on the ensuing kickoff. As a result, the Huskers were able to get a decent return and began their final possession at their own 43-yard line. As time ran down, Tommy Frazier hit tight end Trumane Bell for a 29-yard gain to the FSU 28-yard line. The clock ticked down to 0:00, setting off more chaos on the FSU sideline, complete with the compulsory Gatorade bath given to FSU coach Bobby Bowden. However, referee John Soffey ruled that Bell was down with 1 second left on the clock, and ordered the field cleared, allowing Nebraska placekicker Byron Bennett an opportunity to kick the game-winning field goal. But the 45-yard kick sailed wide left, preserving the 18–16 win for the Seminoles.
1994 – The Choke at Doak – In the greatest fourth-quarter comeback of the series, the Gators led the Seminoles 31–3 after three quarters. However, the Seminoles scored 28 points in the final 15 minutes to tie the game at 31–31.
1995 – The Fifth Quarter in the French Quarter – After the Choke at Doak game ended in a 31–31 tie both teams where selected to the 1995 Sugar Bowl. The game would become known as  "The Fifth Quarter in the French Quarter."  With 1:32 left in the game All-America linebacker Derrick Brooks intercepted a pass from Danny Wuerffel to seal FSU's victory 23–17.
1996 – No. 1 vs No. 2 – The No. 1–ranked and undefeated Gators came into Tallahassee favored against the second-ranked Seminoles. The 'Noles got off to a quick start when Peter Boulware blocked the Gator's first punt of the game, resulting in a touchdown. Florida's eventual Heisman Trophy winner quarterback Danny Wuerffel threw three interceptions in the first half, and FSU had a 17–0 lead after one quarter of play. Wuerffel got on track after that, throwing for three touchdowns. The last one (to WR Reidel Anthony) cut the Florida State lead to three points with just over a minute left to play. The ensuing onside kick went out of bounds, however, and the Seminoles held on for the 24–21 upset win.
1997 – Top Five Matchup in Chapel Hill – In the first ACC game between two teams ranked in the top five, Florida State dominated North Carolina 20–3, the Tar Heels' only defeat on the season.
2000 – FSU Wins Second National Championship – Florida State scored first and took advantage of a blocked punt for a touchdown, giving the Seminoles a 14–0 lead in the first quarter. Virginia Tech, led by QB Michael Vick, answered with a touchdown drive of its own before the end of the quarter, but Florida State scored two quick touchdowns to begin the second quarter. Virginia Tech scored a touchdown before halftime, but halfway through the game, Florida State held a 28–14 lead. In the third quarter, Virginia Tech's offense gave the Hokies a lead with a field goal and two touchdowns. Tech failed to convert two two-point conversions, but held a 29–28 lead at the end of the third quarter. Florida State answered in the fourth quarter, however, taking a 36–29 lead with a touchdown and successful two-point conversion early in the quarter. From this point, the Seminoles did not relinquish the lead, extending it to 46–29 with a field goal and another touchdown. With the win, Florida State clinched the 1999 BCS national championship, the team's second national championship in its history.
2005 – The Miami Muff – In 2005, the Florida State Seminoles finally gained some redemption for the past Wide Right heartbreaks. Miami kicker John Peattie missed two field goals in the 1st quarter, while FSU kicker Gary Cismesia was 1/2 for the game. Trailing 10–7 in the 4th, the Hurricanes drove down the field to set up a game-tying field goal with 2:16 left. When the ball was snapped, it was mishandled by holder Brian Monroe and the ball never reached the kicker's foot. Florida State took over on downs and ran out the clock to end Miami's six-game winning streak in the rivalry.
2010 – The Golden Toe – In the first-ever walk-off, game-winning kick in school history, Dustin Hopkins booted a 55-yard field goal as time expired to lift the Seminoles to a 16–13 victory over Clemson.
2013 – Top Five Matchup in Death Valley – In the second ACC game between two teams ranked in the top five, Florida State handed Clemson their worst home loss in school history.
2014 – FSU Wins Third National Championship – After Florida State scored a field goal on their first drive, Auburn responded with a touchdown in the first quarter and two in the second to storm out to a 21–3 lead. After a successful punt fake, the Seminoles managed a late touchdown before halftime to go into the locker room down, 21–10. Both teams dominated on defense in the third quarter with the Seminoles hitting a field goal to cut the lead to 8. In the fourth quarter, Florida State scored a touchdown early to make it a one-point game. After Auburn made a field goal, Levonte Whitfield returned the following kickoff 100 yards to give the Seminoles the lead, 27–24. Auburn answered with a touchdown to go up 31–27 with 1:19 remaining. On their final drive of 7 plays, Florida State scored a touchdown with 13 seconds remaining, benefiting from a pass interference by Auburn's Chris Davis Jr. on a crucial 3rd and 8. The Seminoles emerged victorious 34–31 to end the SEC's streak of 7 consecutive BCS titles.
2016 –  The Block at The Rock  – Late in the fourth quarter against rival Miami, Florida State had a touchdown lead. Miami scored on an 11-yard reception by Stacey Coley with 1:38 left in the game to make the score 20–19 with an extra point attempt coming. Defensive end DeMarcus Walker blocked the extra point to give Florida State a one-point win.
2021 – 4th and 14 – The Seminoles came out hot, scoring 14 points and forcing three turnovers in the first quarter before taking a 20–7 lead into halftime. Miami would storm back with 21 unanswered points, taking a 28–20 lead with 11 minutes left. After a lengthy drive that resulted in a field goal by the Seminoles and an excellent defensive stop led by defensive end Jermaine Johnson II, the Seminoles had the ball with 2:09 left in the game down 28–23. After a 59 yard bomb caught by wide receiver Ja’Khi Douglas, the Florida State offense sputtered out to a 4th and 14 at the Miami 25 yard line. Florida State quarterback Jordan Travis would convert on a pass to wide receiver Andrew Parchment to the Miami 1 yard line before Travis would run it in himself on both a touchdown and the 2-point conversion to make it 31–28 with 26 seconds left. Miami’s push to tie the game was stopped short when refs ruled the game over after an attempted spike by Miami QB Tyler Van Dyke with less than three seconds left, the minimum time needed according to NCAA rules.

Individual accomplishments

Individual national award winners
Players

Coaches

Individual conference awards

Players

ACC Player of the Year
Charlie Ward (1992, 1993)
Danny Kanell (1995)
Andre Wadsworth (1997)
Chris Weinke (2000)
Jameis Winston (2013)
ACC Rookie of the Year
Tamarick Vanover (1992)
Travis Minor (1997)
Chris Rix (2001)
Jameis Winston (2013)
Deondre Francois (2016)

ACC Offensive Player of the Year
Charlie Ward (1993)
Danny Kanell (1995)
Thad Busby (1997)
Chris Weinke (2000)
Jameis Winston (2013)
ACC Offensive Rookie of the Year
Jameis Winston (2013)
Deondre Francois (2016)

ACC Defensive Player of the Year
Derrick Brooks (1993)
Derrick Alexander (1994)
Peter Boulware (1996)
Andre Wadsworth (1997)
Darnell Dockett (2003)
Björn Werner (2012)
DeMarcus Walker (2016)
Jermaine Johnson II (2021)
ACC Defensive Rookie of the Year
Myron Rolle (2006)
Xavier Rhodes (2010)
Ronald Darby (2012)
Patrick Payton (2022)

Jacobs Blocking Trophy
Clay Shiver (1994,1995)
Tra Thomas (1997)
Tarlos Thomas (2000)
Brett Williams (2001, 2002)
Rodney Hudson (2008, 2009)
Cameron Erving (2013, 2014)
Roderick Johnson (2015, 2016)
Brian Piccolo Award
Dan Footman (1992)
Sam Cowart (1997)
Corey Simon (1998)
Chris Weinke (1999)
Anquan Boldin (2002)
Chris Thompson (2012)
McKenzie Milton (2021)
Jim Tatum Award
 Dillan Gibbons (2022)

Coaches

ACC Coach of the Year
Bobby Bowden (1993, 1997)

Heisman Trophy

Three Florida State players have been awarded the Heisman Trophy. Charlie Ward received the award in 1993, Chris Weinke in 2000 and Jameis Winston in 2013. Casey Weldon finished as runner-up in 1991.

Consensus All-Americans

220 Florida State players have been honored as All-American players with 38 being awarded as consensus All-Americans. Seven Florida State players have been two-time consensus All-Americans.

Unanimous All-Americans
15 Florida State players have been selected as unanimous All-Americans. Deion Sanders is the only Seminole to have been honored as a two-time unanimous selection.

Honored jersey numbers

Hall of Fame inductees

College Football Hall of Fame
Eight FSU players and two coaches have been inducted into the College Football Hall of Fame.  In addition, one former player, Mack Brown, has been inducted into the Hall as a coach.

Pro Football Hall of Fame
Five former Seminoles have been inducted into the Pro Football Hall of Fame.

Canadian Football Hall of Fame
One former Seminole has been inducted into the Canadian Football Hall of Fame.

Records and results

Playoffs
The Seminoles have made one appearance in the College Football Playoff.

All-time record vs. current ACC teams

*Notre Dame is an associate member of the ACC with a scheduling agreement in football*1Denotes one win vacated during the 2006 and 2007 seasons*2Denotes two wins vacated during the 2006 and 2007 seasons

All-time record vs. non-conference opponents

*1Denotes win vacated during the 2006 and 2007 seasons*3Denotes win via forfeit

Polls
Florida State has ended their football season ranked 39 times in either the AP or Coaches Poll.Top-10 finishes are colored ██

† AP Poll began selecting the nation's Top 20 teams in 1936. Only the Top 10 teams were recognized from 1962–1967. The AP Poll expanded back to the Top 20 teams in 1968. In 1989, it began recognizing the Top 25 teams.‡ UPI/Coaches Poll began selecting its Top 20 teams on a weekly basis in 1950 before expanding to the nations's Top 25 teams in 1990.

Traditions

There are numerous Florida State traditions associated with athletics, particularly football. These include the mascots, Osceola and Renegade, the planting of the spear at midfield before football games, the FSU Fight Song, the FSU Hymns, the War Chant, and the Tomahawk Chop. The team's uniforms pay respect to the Seminole culture using tribal influences with Native American symbols representing an arrow, a man on a horse, and fire. Fans of the Florida State Seminoles are known as The Tribe, a nod to the nickname that the team carries.

Osceola and Renegade

Osceola and Renegade are the official symbols of the Florida State Seminoles. During home football games, Osceola, portraying the Seminole leader Osceola, charges down the field at Bobby Bowden Field at Doak Campbell Stadium riding an appaloosa horse named Renegade, and hurls a burning spear at midfield to begin every game. The Seminole Tribe of Florida officially sanctions the use of the Seminole as Florida State University's nickname and of Osceola as FSU's symbol.

Marching Chiefs

The Marching Chiefs is the official marching band of the Florida State Seminoles. The band plays at every home game as well as at some away games (Clemson, Miami, and Florida) as well as any Championship or Bowl game. There are upwards of 470 members in the band, holding the distinction of being the world's largest collegiate marching band.

War Chant
The Seminole War Chant was first used in a 1984 game against Auburn. The chant was started in FSU's Marching Band – The Marching Chiefs, originally by members of the percussion section. The melody is based on the 1960s cheer, massacre. The chant has also become associated with the tomahawk chop.

The War Chant would be adopted by the Atlanta Braves when FSU football alumnus Deion Sanders joined the team, and has been used ever since.  Craig Day began the Chop at now-defunct Fulton County stadium in response to UF Gator fans doing the Gator Chomp every time Deion came up to the plate. It is also used by the NFL team the Kansas City Chiefs, Mexican soccer club Santos Laguna and the Turkish soccer club Galatasaray.

Sod Cemetery

Florida State's Sod Cemetery is a rich part of the program's history. When FSU wins a difficult away game, a piece of turf is pulled from the field and buried in the cemetery. Florida State sod games represent the most difficult battles on the football field. The Sod Cemetery stands as a tribute to those triumphs. There are 106 pieces of sod in the cemetery.

In 1962, as the Seminoles completed their Thursday practice in preparation to face Georgia at Sanford Stadium, Dean Coyle Moore – a long-time professor and member of FSU's athletic board – issued a challenge: "Bring back some sod from between the hedges at Georgia." On Saturday, October 20, the Seminoles scored an 18–0 victory over the favored Bulldogs. Team captain Gene McDowell pulled a small piece of grass from the field, which was presented to Moore at the next football practice. Moore and FSU coach Bill Peterson had the sod buried on the practice field as a symbol of victory. A monument was placed to commemorate the triumph and the tradition of the sod game was born.

Before leaving for all road games in which Florida State is the underdog, all road games at the University of Florida and all ACC championship and bowl games, Seminole captains gather their teammates to explain the significance of the tradition. Victorious captains return with a piece of the opponent's turf to be buried in the Sod Cemetery inside the gates of the practice field. In recent years, as the Florida State program has been successful, games of significance regardless of whether or not the Seminoles are the underdog, can be designated a "sod game."

College GameDay
The Seminoles have appeared on ESPN's College GameDay 35 times, with 6 bowl appearances. The first ever broadcast of the show took place in South Bend, Indiana when then No. 1 FSU traveled to play the No. 2 Notre Dame Fighting Irish in what was called the Game of the Century. Florida State is 17–18 in games played when College GameDay has traveled to Seminole games. Florida State has hosted the program 11 times, the most by any ACC school. The most recent visit came in 2014 when Notre Dame played in Tallahassee. The Seminoles have a 7–4 record when GameDay is on campus.

Famous former players
Lee Corso – Retired college football head coach, College GameDay analyst
Burt Reynolds – Actor, following Reynold’s death in 2018, the song Eastbound and Down from the film Smokey and the Bandit (in which he starred) is played at the start of the fourth quarter at home games as a tribute.
Ron Simmons – former professional wrestler
Mack Brown – Head coach of the North Carolina Tar Heels and former coach of the Texas Longhorns
T. K. Wetherell – Former President of Florida State University from 2003–2009
Deion Sanders – Hall of Fame NFL player, head college football coach, football analyst and celebrity personality, is the only player to play in both the World Series and Super Bowl.

Seminoles in the NFL

Florida State has sent 293 players to the National Football League since 1951, including 46 first-round draft picks. Jameis Winston holds the record as the highest Seminole taken in the NFL Draft as he was selected with the first overall pick by Tampa Bay in the 2015 draft, the highest by a Florida State player since Andre Wadsworth was selected third overall by the Arizona Cardinals in 1998. Eleven players, a school record, were taken in the 2013 NFL Draft, a record tied in 2015. Florida State had 29 players drafted over a three-year period from 2013–2015, the most of any team in the modern draft.

Seventy-four former players have gone on to play in the Super Bowl with two, Fred Biletnikoff and Dexter Jackson, being named the Super Bowl MVP. Three former Seminoles (Derrick Brooks, Warrick Dunn and Anquan Boldin) have won the Walter Payton Award.

Future opponents

Conference

Non-conference
 By decree of the Florida Board of Regents, Florida State and Florida must play each other every year.

See also
Florida State Seminoles
List of Florida State University professional athletes

Notes
The school played three seasons as Florida State College from 1902 to 1904 and resumed playing as Florida State University in 1947.

References

 Florida State Seminoles Football Media Guide, Florida State University Athletics Department, Tallahassee, Florida

External links

 

 
American football teams established in 1902
1902 establishments in Florida